Sergey Leonyuk (born 3 April 1960) is a former professional tennis player from Belarus.

Biography
Leonyuk was born in Minsk, the capital of the Byelorussian Soviet Socialist Republic, modern day Belarus. He represented the Soviet Union and was a nine time Soviet champion.

In 1978 he played in a Grand Prix tournament in Calcutta, India. He lost in the first round of the singles to Ramesh Krishnan and also played in the doubles draw with Igor Tihonenko.

He won a bronze medal in singles and silver medal in doubles at the Friendship Games, held in Poland in 1984, for nations that boycotted the Summer Olympics.

A regular Davis Cup representative for the Soviet Union, he appeared in 13 ties in the 1980s, including stints in the World Group. In 1985 he and Alexander Zverev came from two sets down to win a doubles match over Czechoslovakia's Tomáš Šmíd and Libor Pimek in Tbilisi. 

He won one Challenger title, the Tampere Open in 1986, which he and Ģirts Dzelde won with a walkover in the final.

In the wake of the Chernobyl disaster, Leonyuk moved to Brooklyn, New York to ensure his children's safety. He brought with him a promising 15-year old junior from Minsk, Vladimir Voltchkov, who he housed and coached. 

In the 1990s, Leonyuk was an assistant coach of the Russian Davis Cup team. He has also served as the tournament director of the Kremlin Cup.

Challenger titles

Doubles: (1)

See also
List of Soviet Davis Cup team representatives

References

External links
 
 
 

1960 births
Living people
Soviet male tennis players
Belarusian male tennis players
Tennis players from Minsk
Belarusian expatriate sportspeople in the United States
Belarusian tennis coaches
Universiade medalists in tennis
Universiade gold medalists for the Soviet Union
Universiade silver medalists for the Soviet Union
Universiade bronze medalists for the Soviet Union
Medalists at the 1981 Summer Universiade
Competitors at the 1986 Goodwill Games
Goodwill Games medalists in tennis
Friendship Games medalists in tennis